State Route 75 (SR 75) is state highway in Tennessee in the northeastern portion of the state. The highway begins at US 11E and US 321 in Limestone and ends at SR 126 in Blountville.

Route description

Washington County

SR 75 begins as a 2-lane highway in Washington County in Limestone at an intersection with US 11E/US 321/SR 34. The highway then heads northeast through rural farmland to have an intersection with SR 81 just before passing through Sulphur Springs. SR 75 then continues to enter Gray, where it has an interchange with I-26/US 23 (Exit 13). The highway then widens to a 4-lane undivided highway and passes just southeast of downtown before leaving Gray and passing through Spurgeon, where it has an intersection with SR 36. SR 75 then crosses the South Fork Holston River into Sullivan County, just north of Boone Dam and Boone Lake.

Sullivan County

SR 75 continues northeast to pass through Boring before entering Blountville and passing by the Tri-Cities Regional Airport, where it has an interchange with SR 357. SR 75 then narrows to 2-lanes and passes rural areas of Blountville before entering downtown, where it comes to an intersection with SR 126.

The entire route of SR 75 is a secondary highway.

Future
A widening project has been taking place on SR 75 to provide a four-lane highway from Interstate 26 in Gray to the Tri-Cities Regional Airport in Blountville. On November 1, 2013 TDOT opened all four lanes of traffic, but much work still needs to be done.

Junction list

References

External links
SR 75 and SR 36 Construction project

075
Transportation in Sullivan County, Tennessee
Transportation in Washington County, Tennessee